Liu Kun (270 – 22 June 318), courtesy name Yueshi, was a Chinese military general and poet of the Jin dynasty. He was a famous writer during the Western Jin dynasty and was known for his services as the Inspector of Bingzhou where he continuously fought with the growing threat of the Xiongnu-led Han Zhao dynasty. Despite his determination and active role in fighting back Han Zhao, he lacked the sufficient skills in administration and military to match his enemies and suffered repeated losses to Liu Yao and Shi Le. He was eventually driven out from Bingzhou after suffering a decisive defeat to Shi Le in 316 and fled to Youzhou, where he allied with the Xianbei chieftain, Duan Pidi. However, after Pidi suspected him of betrayal, he was eventually executed via strangulation in 318.

Early life and career 
Liu Kun was born in Weichang county, Zhongshan commandery and it was said that he was a descendant of the Han prince, Liu Sheng. Both his father Liu Fan (劉蕃) and grandfather Liu Mai (劉邁) had both served as government officials.  Together with his brother Liu Yu (劉輿), Liu Kun achieved celebrity status for his talent in writing whilst working in the Jin capital in Luoyang. The two brothers earned the epithet junlang (儁朗), which meant "outstanding and bright" and were part of Shi Chong’s inner circle called the "Twenty-Four Friends of Jingu (二十四友)”, a group of celebrities who were close associates with Empress Jia’s nephew, Jia Mi. Unfortunately, none of Liu Kun's works during his time with the group survived.

War of the Eight Princes

Service under Sima Lun and Sima Jiong 
A civil war broke out in 301 when Emperor Hui of Jin’s regent, Sima Lun deposed him and declared himself emperor. Liu Kun’s family sided with Sima Lun against Sima Jiong, Sima Ying and Sima Yong’s coalition, since his sister was married to Sima Lun’s daughter. Liu Kun commanded an army at the Battle of Huangqiao (黃橋, in present-day Taixing, Jiangsu) but he and his allies retreated after being decisively defeated. By the middle of the year, Sima Lun was overthrown and forced to commit suicide while Sima Jiong becomes Emperor Hui’s new regent. Jiong had many of Lun’s partisans executed but he was impressed with the talents possessed by Liu Kun’s family, so he gave them appointments in his new government. After Jiong was killed in battle against Sima Ai in 303, the Liu family went to serve the Prince of Fanyang, Sima Xiao (司馬虓).

Service under Sima Xiao 
In 305, after Sima Yong had forcibly relocated Emperor Hui from Luoyang to Chang'an, Sima Xiao joined a coalition led by the Prince of Donghai, Sima Yue, to retrieve the emperor back to Luoyang. Shortly after declaring the coalition, Sima Yue gave out a number of appointments on his own accord, which Liu Kun and his family benefitted from. Liu Fan was appointed Army Protector of Huaibei, Liu Yu was appointed Administrator of Yingchuan while Liu Kun was made a Marshal by Sima Xiao. Meanwhile, the Inspector of Yuzhou, Liu Qiao, was transferred to Inspector of Jizhou, with his old position being given to Sima Xiao. 

Although Liu Qiao was a member of the coalition, he became angry at Sima Yue for acting beyond his discretion without the emperor's approval, and he extended his anger to Liu Kun and Liu Yu. As a result, he defected to Sima Yong and sent a letter to his court in which he denounced Liu Kun and Liu Yu for their crimes while stating his intention in attacking Sima Xiao’s base in Xuchang. Due to Xuchang’s poor defences, Liu Qiao easily captured the city along with Liu Kun's parents. Liu Kun tried leading soldiers to save the city but was unable to arrive in time, so he, Liu Yu and Sima Xiao fled north to Jizhou.

At Jizhou, Liu Kun managed to convince its inspector, Wen Xian (溫羨), who happened to be a relative of his, to give up his post to Sima Xiao. With a province at hand, Liu Kun was sent to Youzhou to request assistance from the commander of the province, Wang Jun. With the help of Wang Jun's Xianbei and Wuhuan "charging cavalries", Liu Kun and Sima Xiao attacked Liu Qiao's reserves at Heqiao (河穚; southwest of present-day Mengzhou, Henan) and killed the general, Wang Chan (王闡). They later crossed the Yangzi River and attacked Liu Qiao's allies at Xingyang, where they also killed Shi Chao. 

As Liu Qiao fell back to Kaocheng (考城, in modern Shangqiu, Henan), Liu Kun and another general, Tian Hui (田徽), routed his ally, Sima Mao (司馬楙) at Linqiu (廩丘, in present-day Heze, Shandong). Liu Kun then divided his troops and advanced to Xuchang, whereupon its inhabitants welcomed him without a fight. Finally, Liu Kun marched to Xiao County to link up with Sima Yue, whose army had been blocked from marching into the Guanzhong region by Liu Qiao's son, Liu You (劉祐). Liu Kun defeated and killed Liu You, causing Liu Qiao's army to scatter.

Liu Qiao’s defeat caused Sima Yong to panic, and he tried to sue for peace with Sima Yue. He beheaded his Grand Commander Zhang Fang and delivered the head to Yue, but the offer was rejected. Instead, the head was given to Liu Kun, who used it to convince Lü Lang (呂朗) and Sima Yong’s other generals to surrender. After Sima Yue's forces captured Chang'an, Liu Kun was awarded the title of Marquis of Guangwu.

Inspector of Bingzhou

Restoring Bingzhou 
Sima Yue, at the advice of Liu Yu, appointed Liu Kun as the Inspector of Bingzhou to guard the northern borders. The province at the time was ravaged with poor harvests and constant raids by barbarians and bandits. When the previous inspector Sima Teng (司馬騰) left, the bandits took over the roads, forcing Liu Kun to fight his way to his base in Jinyang (晉陽縣; present-day Jinyuan District, Taiyuan, Shanxi). Liu Kun reached Jinyang in 307, and along the way he found the countryside and ministers plundered or burnt to the ground. The Xiongnu noble, Liu Yuan, who had established his state of Han Zhao back in 304, ordered his general Liu Jing (劉景) to intercept Liu Kun from reaching Jinyang but he was defeated. Liu Kun restored order over the region, and within a year Bingzhou would recover from its poor state.

The following year, Liu Yuan invaded Bingzhou again, this time sending Liu Cong, Wang Mi and Shi Le to conquer Huguan county. Liu Kun sent his subordinate Huang Su (黃肅) and Han Shu (韓述) to reinforce the county but Liu Cong killed the two of them in battle while reinforcements sent by Sima Yue were routed by Wang Mi. In the end, his Administrator of Shangdang, Pang Chun (龐淳), surrendered Huguan to Han.

Alliance with Tuoba Yilu and conflict with Wang Jun 
Shortly after this defeat, Liu Kun campaigned against the Tiefu Xiongnu, led by Liu Hu (劉虎), and the Xianbei Bai (鮮卑皆) tribe who had sided with Liu Yuan. In 310, Liu Kun allied himself with Tuoba Yilu, chieftain of the Tuoba Xianbei, and with Yilu’s nephew, Tuoba Yulü, they routed Liu Hu and his allies. Soon after, Liu Kun developed a brotherly bond with Tuoba Yilu. As a reward for his assistance, Liu Kun sent a petition to the court, demanding that Yilu be appointed Grand Chanyu and receive Dai commandery as a fief. The petition was accepted but it also angered Liu Kun’s colleague, Wang Jun, who saw Dai as a part of his territory. Wang Jun attack Yilu but his forces were repelled. Because of this, Liu Kun and Wang Jun developed a heated rivalry, one that would be exploited by their enemies in Han.

The next year, Liu Kun discovered that the mother and nephew of Han’s general, Shi Le were wandering in his territory. Liu Kun delivered Lady Wang (王氏) and Shi Hu to Shi Le, along with a letter convincing him to side with Jin. Shi Le rejected his letter but still returned him gifts for returning him his mother. Later that year, Liu Kun realized that population growth in Bingzhou was stagnant, and with the recent battles, the population was beginning to decline. To fix this, Liu Kun ordered his kinsman Liu Xi (劉希) to gather people from Wang Jun’s territories while also requesting from Tuoba Yilu for additional troops. Liu Xi’s failed at his task, as Wang Jun discovered his intrusion and had his generals defeat and kill Liu Xi in battle. His deal with Tuoba Yilu also ended disastrously, as an altercation between Yilu’s candidate, Tuoba Liuxiu (拓跋六脩) and Liu Kun’s officer Xing Yan (邢延) led to Xing defecting and surrendering Xinxing commandery (新興, in present-day Xinzhou, Shanxi) to Han.

Xu Run affair 
In 312, Liu Kun appointed a man named Xu Run (徐潤) as the Prefect of Jinyang. Xu had impressed Liu Kun through his musical talents to earn his position, but his administration showed his cruelty and corruption. The Army Protector, Linghu Sheng (令狐盛) urged Liu Kun to get rid off Xu Run but his advice fell on deaf ears. Hearing this, Xu Run slandered Linghu Sheng to the point that Liu Kun decided to execute him. Sheng’s son, Linghu Ni (令狐泥) fled to Han, where he revealed to the now emperor Liu Cong of Kun’s situation. Liu Cong sent Liu Yao and Liu Can with Linghu Ni as a guide to conquer Bingzhou, and the Han forces managed to force Liu Kun out of Jinyang. Linghu Ni also killed both of Liu Kun’s parents while they were fleeing with him. Liu Kun managed to recapture Jinyang with Tuoba Yilu’s assistance but by that time the city had been sacked by Liu Yao. Liu Kun regathered his scattered forces and made way to his new capital in Yangqu.

Fall of Bingzhou 
The following year, Liu Kun and Tuoba Yilu attacked Xiping but movements by Han troops persuaded them to retreat. In 314, Shi Le was planning to finish off Wang Jun in Youzhou. Shi Le wrote a letter pretending to look weak by asking Liu Kun for permission to attack Wang while also sending hostages to him. Liu Kun believed the letter and was delighted, even going as far as to spread this news throughout his domain. However, things took a turn after Shi Le captured and executed Wang Jun, causing Liu Kun to realize that he had been trick. Furthermore, Shi Le’s recent victory prompted many of those in Tuoba Yilu’s domain to defect, forcing Yilu to purge many families in Dai.

Tuoba Yilu was assassinated by Tuoba Liuxiu in 316. Dai fell into civil war between Liuxiu and Tuoba Pugen which caused Yilu’s general Ji Dan (箕澹) and Wei Xiong (衞雄) to join Liu Kun with thousands of families and livestock. Morale in Liu Kun’s territory arose as their recent fortunes meant that there was a chance to turn the tides. However, not long after, Shi Le besieged the Administrator of Leping (樂平, in present-day Shanxi), Han Ju (韓據) at Diancheng (坫城). Liu Kun accepted Han Ju’s call for help and insisted on using his newly received forces. Ji Dan and Wei Xiong remonstrated him, saying that the troops were not loyal to him yet and that they should be kept for the future. Liu Kun ignored their advices and ordered Ji Dan with the whole army to attack Shi Le. Shi Le greatly routed Ji Dan, causing him and Wei Xiong to flee back to Dai. Meanwhile, Han Ju abandoned Tiancheng to Shi Le as reinforcements failed to relief him. With Liu Kun’s army on the brink of destruction, Liu Kun’s Chief Clerk, Li Hong (李弘), handed over Bingzhou to Han.

Final years and death

Alliance with Duan Pidi 
After the loss of Bing Province, Liu Kun was left with nothing and nowhere to go. Hearing this, Inspector of Youzhou and a head of the Duan tribe, Duan Pidi, sent a letter to Liu Kun inviting him to his headquarters in Jicheng. Liu Kun met him, and the two men started a mutual relationship, arranging a marriage between their relatives. In 317, they swore an oath with each other and sent a joint petition to Sima Rui in Jiankang insisting he claim the imperial title. Liu Kun's envoy was Wen Jiao, whose aunt was married to Liu Kun. The same year, both men planned an attack against Shi Le with Duan Pidi's brothers, but the plan was axed as Pidi's brothers refused to take orders from him. The following year, after Sima Rui ascended the throne as Emperor Yuan of Jin, Liu Kun was appointed Palace Attendant and Defender-in-Chief and was presented a famous sword.

Accusation of betrayal and death 
Despite his newfound ally and base, Liu Kun would soon meet his end at the hands of Duan Pidi. Duan Pidi's brother and chieftain of the Duan, Duan Jilujuan passed away. His cousin Duan Mopei took advantage of his death to usurp the tribe's power. After killing his uncle and cousin's successor, Duan Shefuchen, Duan Mopei attacked Duan Pidi who was travelling to attend the funeral, causing him to retreat. In the assault, Liu Kun's eldest son, Liu Qun (劉群) was captured by Duan Mopei. Duan Mopei treated him with respect and even convinced him to write a letter to his father inviting him over to his side. The letter, however, was intercepted by Duan Pidi's scouts.

Duan Pidi showed the letter to Liu Kun, who at the time had not known of the events that happened. Liu Kun assured Pidi that he would not betray him, even if the letter was indeed from his son. Duan Pidi initially let him off but his younger brother, Duan Shujun (段叔軍), told him: "We are tribesmen, after all, and anyone who can retain the loyalty of the Jin people will fear our own forces. Now there is this strife within our family, splitting apart the flesh and the bones, and Liu Kun must have planned for this day all along. If you allow Liu Kun to rise, it will mean the end of all our clan." Duan Pidi heeded his advice and arrested Liu Kun.

When news of Liu Kun's arrest came out, Kun's son, Liu Zun mounted a defence in his camp but was quickly defeated by Duan Pidi. Two of Liu Kun's generals Pilü Song (辟閭嵩) and Han Ju, also planned to do the same, but their plot was leaked, so Pidi captured and executed them along with their other collaborators. Sima Rui's powerful general in the south, Wang Dun, had always despised Liu Kun. Upon hearing his arrest, Wang secretly sent a messenger to Duan Pidi asking him to kill Liu Kun. On the 22nd of June, while claiming that he had received an imperial edict, Duan Pidi had Liu Kun strangled along with four of his sons and nephews.

Aftermath 
Some of Liu Kun's followers, including Lu Chen and Cui Yue (崔悅), fled to Duan Mopei, where they acclaimed Liu Qun as their leader while others went to serve with Shi Le. Because he killed Liu Kun and broke his oath, Duan Pidi lost the trust of both the Han Chinese and tribal people. Although Sima Rui permitted no one to hold mourning for him to ensure Duan Pidi's allegiance to Jin, both Wen Jiao and Duan Mopei petitioned that Liu Kun be honored posthumously as he had been a loyal Jin subject. Some years later, Liu Kun was posthumously appointed as Grand Commandant and Palace Attendant and given the posthumous name "Min (愍)" or "the Lamented".

Children 
Liu Kun had at least two sons, Liu Zun (劉遵, who was a son to his father's concubine) and Liu Qun.

Liu Zun 
When Liu Kun first allied himself with Tuoba Yilu, Liu Zun was sent to Dai to serve as a hostage to ensure Liu Kun's loyalty. He was returned to his father in 316 by Ji Dan and Wei Xiong when they fled to him to escape Dai. After Duan Pidi arrested Liu Kun in 318, Zun mounted a defense in his own camp against Pidi but was swiftly defeated and captured. His final fate is not recorded but it is most likely he was one of the four sons and nephews executed alongside his father.

Liu Qun 
Liu Kun's other son, Liu Qun, courtesy name Gongdu (公度), was described as cautious and good at passing judgement. Prior to his capture by Duan Mopei in 318, he followed his father and fought during his march to Jinyang in 307, helping him secure the provincial capital. After Qun was acclaimed as his father's successor, he remained with the Duan clan for roughly two decades, eventually becoming one of Duan Liao's Chief Clerks of the Left and Right. In 338, amidst the Later Zhao and Former Yan joint campaign on the Duan clan, Liu Qun together with Lu Chen and Cui Yue surrendered to the Zhao forces, and Shi Hu, now ruler of Zhao, appointed Liu Qun the Inspector of Qinzhou. In 349, Shi Hu's Han Chinese grandson, Shi Min took over the government and installed his uncle Shi Jian as a puppet emperor. Liu Qun appears to have supported Shi Min, as he was made Supervisor of the Left of the Masters of Writing by Min himself. Shi Min eventually formed the state of Ran Wei in 350, changing his name to Ran Min in the process, and Liu Qun became his Deputy Director. Liu was later killed by invading Former Yan forces in 352.

Poetry 
Although Liu Kun only has three surviving poems, he was famous for his works as a poet, his most known being the "Song of Fufeng (扶風歌)".  The poem is written during Liu Kun's trip from Luoyang to Jinyang between 306 and 307 and centres around his reluctance in leaving the capital. The poem is unique for its time as it contains elements of poems from the Jian'an and early Cao Wei period. His other two poems are from two letters he exchanged with his wife's nephew, Lu Chen between 317 and 318. They are known as "Poem for Lu Chen (贈盧諶詩)" and "Response to Lu Chen (答盧諶詩)". His poems were compiled in a Liang Dynasty catalog as the "Liu Kun Ji (劉琨集)".

Anecdote

"Rising at Cockcrow to Practice the Sword" 
During his time as Registrar in Sichuan in the 290s, Liu Kun befriended a colleague named Zu Ti, who would later become one of Western Jin's most famous general. When they were sleeping in the same bed one night, they heard a rooster's crow at midnight. As this was a bad omen, Zu Ti kicked Liu Kun awake, telling him "This is no evil sound!" The two men got up and performed a sword dance. This event inspired the Chinese phrase "rising at cockcrow to practice the sword (聞雞起舞)".

Lifting a siege by playing a flute 
Another anecdote tells of how Liu Kun drove back a Xiongnu army by playing the nomad flute. His headquarters in Jinyang was constantly besieged by the Xiongnu. In one of these sieges, Liu Kun took advantage of the moonlight to climb a tall building, where he began to whistle cleanly. This caught the attention of the invaders, who went heart-sore and made long sighs because of Liu Kun's whistling. Liu Kun then began playing the nomad flute with his men. The songs that Liu Kun played reminded the barbarians of their homelands and how much they miss it. Towards dawn, Liu Kun played the flute again, this time convincing the invaders to leave and abandon the siege.

References 

 Fang, Xuanling (ed.) (648). Book of Jin (Jin Shu).
 Liu, Yiqing (ed.) ( 5th century). A New Account of the Tales of the World (Shishuo Xinyu / Shiyu).
 Sima, Guang (1084). Zizhi Tongjian.

270 births
318 deaths
Executed Jin dynasty (266–420) people
Jin dynasty (266–420) generals
Jin dynasty (266–420) poets